Costafabbri is a village in Tuscany, central Italy, in the comune of Siena, province of Siena.

Costafabbri is about 3 km from Siena.

Bibliography 
 

Frazioni of Siena